The color khaki is a light shade of tan with a slight yellowish tinge.

Khaki has been used by many armies around the world for uniforms and equipment, particularly in arid or desert regions, where it provides camouflage relative to sandy or dusty terrain. It has been used as a color name in English since 1848 when it was first introduced as a military uniform. In Western fashion, it is a standard color for smart casual dress trousers for civilians, which are also often called khakis.

In British English and some other Commonwealth usage, khaki may also refer to a shade of green  known as olive drab.

Etymology

Khaki is a loanword from Urdu خاکی 'soil-colored', which in turn comes from Persian خاک  khâk 'soil' + ی (adjectival ending); it came into English via the British Indian Army.

Origin
Khaki was first worn as a uniform in the Corps of Guides that was raised in December 1846 by Henry Lawrence (1806–1857), agent to the Governor-General for the North-West Frontier and stationed in Lahore. Initially the border troops were dressed in their native costume, which consisted of a smock and white pajama trousers made of a coarse home-spun cotton, and a cotton turban, supplemented by a leather or padded cotton jacket for cold weather. In 1848, a khaki uniform was introduced. Subsequently, all regiments serving in the region, whether British or Indian, had adopted khaki uniforms for active service and summer dress. The original khaki fabric was a closely twilled cloth of linen or cotton.

Military use

The impracticality of traditional bright colors such as the red coat, especially for skirmishing, was recognised early in the 19th century. A response to improved technologies such as aerial surveillance and smokeless powder, khaki could camouflage soldiers in the field of battle.

Khaki-colored uniforms were used officially by British troops for the first time during the 1868 Expedition to Abyssinia, when Indian troops traveled to Ethiopia. Subsequently, the British Army adopted khaki for colonial campaign dress and it was used in the Mahdist War (1884–89) and Second Boer War (1899–1902). These uniforms became known as khaki drill, versions of which are still part of the uniforms of the British Army. 

During the Second Boer War, the British forces became known as Khakis because of their uniforms. After victory in the war, the government called an election, which became known as the khaki election, a term used subsequently for elections called to exploit public approval of governments immediately after military victories.

The United States Army adopted khaki during the Spanish–American War (1898), replacing their traditional blue field uniforms. The United States Navy and United States Marine Corps followed suit, authorizing khaki field and work uniforms.

 

When khaki was adopted for the continental British Service Dress in 1902, the shade chosen had a clearly darker and more green hue (see photo). This color was adopted with minor variations by all the British Empire armies. The 1902 US Army uniform regulations also adopted a similar shade for soldiers' winter service uniforms under the name olive drab. This shade of brown-green remained in use by many countries throughout the two World Wars.

Use in civilian clothing 
Following World War II, military-issue khaki-colored chino cloth twill trousers became a common part of civilian clothing. Today, the term khakis is sometimes used to refer to the style of trousers, properly called chinos, regardless of their color.

Tones of khaki

Light khaki

At right is displayed the color light khaki (also called khaki tan or just tan).

Khaki

This is the web color called khaki in HTML/CSS.

The color shown at right matches the color designated as khaki in the 1930 book A Dictionary of Color, the standard for color nomenclature before the introduction of computers.

Dark khaki

At right is displayed the web color dark khaki.

It corresponds to Dark Khaki in the X11 color names.

Khaki green

At right is displayed the color khaki green, sometimes called simply khaki in Commonwealth countries. It is more commonly called olive green or olive drab.

See also
 Khaki University

References

External links

Shades of brown
Shades of yellow
Shades of green